Nuculana sufficientia is a species of marine bivalvia mollusc in the family Nuculanidae.

Distribution
This marine species occurs off the Philippines.

References

Poppe G.T. & Tagaro S. (2016). New marine mollusks from the central Philippines in the families Aclididae, Chilodontidae, Cuspidariidae, Nuculanidae, Nystiellidae, Seraphsidae and Vanikoridae. Visaya. 4(5): 83-103. page(s): 83.

External links
 Worms Link

Nuculanidae